Ōtsuki may refer to:

Ōtsuki, Yamanashi, a city in Yamanashi Prefecture, Japan
Ōtsuki Station, a railway station in Ōtsuki, Yamanashi, Japan
Ōtsuki, Kōchi, a town in Hata District, Kōchi Prefecture, Japan
Ōtsuki (surname), a Japanese surname